Iain or Ian Sutherland may refer to:

 Iain Sutherland (conductor) (born 1936), British conductor
 Iain Sutherland (diplomat) (1925–1986), British diplomat
 Iain Sutherland (1948–2019), member of the Sutherland Brothers
Ian Sutherland (screenwriter), see Trust the Navy
 Ian Sutherland (bowls) (1935–1999), Welsh lawn bowler